The Woodbury–Story House is a National Register of Historic Places structure (site #93001463) in Altadena, California.  It was placed on the Register in 1993 for its significance as an example of Italianate and Colonial Revival architecture styles and its association with Capt. Frederick Woodbury, one of the founders of Altadena.

History
The home was built in 1882 for Capt. Frederick Woodbury, and his wife, Martha. The home was the headquarters for a ranch that included a two-story bunkhouse for the ranch hands.  Citrus groves and vineyards were planted on the land.  Capt. Woodbury planted the deodar cedars that line the contemporary Santa Rosa Ave., also known as Christmas Tree Lane, another National Register site.  In 1892, Capt. Woodbury sold the home to a man named Walker, who in turn sold it to Hampton L. Story in 1894.  During the decades following Story's death, the home became a coffee shop, sheriff's station, a fire engine house, office building and a tea house.

In popular culture
This property has been used as the filming location for various movies, which include Amityville Horror: The Evil Escapes (1989), Attack of the Killer Doughnuts (2010), V/H/S (Or more specifically the segment by Radio Silence, '10/31/98') (2012) Unconscious (2014) and Keep Watching (2017). It was also used in the (2011) music video, Sail by AWOLNATION. SAIL

The home was first reported as a Haunted House in the book "Haunted Houses of Pasadena" by Michael J. Kouri, which covers Altadena, Pasadena and other parts of the original Spanish land grant known as Rancho el Rincon de San Pasqual. The author personally investigated the Woodbury/Story house over twenty-five years ago. Photos of the ghosts who haunt the mansion were shown in his book and will appear in the book "Historical Hauntings in Altadena, California" when it is released in October 2020.

Television
The Woodbury–Story House was used as a filming location in the season 7 episode of American Horror Story entitled "Winter of Discontent". It aired on October 24, 2017, on the cable network FX.

The paranormal reality television series Ghost Adventures covered the story of the Woodbury–Story House, in the episode "The Woodbury: Home of American Horror Story" on the Travel Channel in 2019.

References

External links

 

Houses in Altadena, California
Houses completed in 1882
Houses on the National Register of Historic Places in California
Italianate architecture in California
Buildings and structures on the National Register of Historic Places in Los Angeles County, California